Punjala Shiv Shankar (10 August 1929 – 27 February 2017) was an Indian politician. He served as the Minister of External Affairs, Law, and Petroleum. He was a very influential minister in Indira Gandhi's and Rajiv Gandhi's cabinets and was one of the most senior politicians in India. He also served as Governor of Sikkim from 1994 to 1995 and Governor of Kerala from 1995 to 1996.

Personal life
P. Shiv Shankar was born on 10 August 1929 in Mamidipalli, District of Hyderabad, British India (Now in Telangana, India) to the Late Shri P. Bashiah. He studied B.A. at Hindu College, Amritsar and LL.B. at Law College, Osmania University, Hyderabad. He was married to Dr. (Smt.) P. Lakshmibai on 2 June 1955. He has two sons and one daughter.

Career
P. Shiv Shankar worked to serve the poor and worked for the welfare of his country. He was a judge in the Andhra Pradesh High Court during 1974 and 1975. 

He was elected to 6th Lok Sabha from Secunderabad in 1979. He was a member of the Indian National Congress political party. He was re-elected from same constituency in 1980. He was made Law Minister in Third Indira Gandhi Ministry in 1980. 

Shiv Shankar had held several positions in the Government, however, it was his stint as the Union Law Minister in Indira Gandhi Cabinet, after her return to power in 1980, which was the turning point in India's judiciary. 

As Union Law Minister, Shiv Shankar was responsible for the issue of circulars, attempting to transfer judges. On 18 March 1981, Shiv Shankar, as the Law Minister, addressed a circular to the governors and chief ministers of all States requesting them to elicit from additional judges their agreement to be transferred to any high court. 

The reasons mentioned in the circular were that such a policy of transfer would help national integration, combat narrow and parochial tendencies like caste, kinship, and other local considerations. 

But the circular was largely seen as an expression of no-confidence in the judiciary and a device to punish the inconvenient judges. Granville Austin, in his Working A Democratic Constitution: The Indian Experience (1999), said about the circular: "This threw kerosene on existing flames when it became public knowledge in mid-April (1981) that the circular asked the recipients to obtain from the additional judges in the state’s high court ‘their consent to be appointed permanent judges in any other high court (they might indicate three courts in order of preference) and to obtain from potential judges ‘their consent to be appointed to any other high court in the country.’"

The written consents and preferences were to be sent to Shiv Shankar within two weeks. 

In the Lok Sabha, Shiv Shankar asked if the independence of the Judiciary meant "touch-me-not".

He seemed to confirm that he sent the circular without consulting the then Chief Justice of India, Y.V.Chandrachud. What happened thereafter is history. On 30 December 1981, the Supreme Court's seven Judge bench gave its decision in S.P. Gupta vs Union of India, in which the Court held that Shiv Shankar's circular was not unconstitutional, because it had no legal force in the first place. 

In his book, Austin refers to different perceptions of Shiv Shankar during this period.
One school of thought believed that he intended to reduce judicial independence, and he carefully avoided recommending for appointment judges unfriendly to Mrs.Gandhi, the then Prime Minister.
Another body of opinion, Austin notes, held that his circular was not intended to intimidate judges into ruling in favour of the government. 

Shiv Shankar was not averse to ‘shaking up’ judges partly to caution them when considering the government's interest, but his principal motivation seems to have been in class and caste consciousness. 

As Austin puts it: "To him, judges were intellectuals or Brahmins, or from the newly strong economic castes and classes-the upper reaches of the Other Backward Classes – whose monopoly had to be broken, so that lower-ranking members of the OBCs and Scheduled Castes and Tribes could ‘thrive’ as advocates and find their way to the bench".

Austin adds that Shiv Shankar believed that Chief Justices of High courts showed caste preferences in selecting colleagues and in deciding cases, and transfers might ameliorate this because outside judges would have no local roots.

Austin also records a personal element which motivated Shiv Shankar. "A self-made man from the Kapu community in Andhra Pradesh (a large community of agriculturists at the lower rungs of the OBCs), he thought the Reddy community dominated the high court there, and he had resigned from the high court when he thought a Reddy Judge had denied him the chief justiceship." Shiv Shankar was a Judge in Andhra Pradesh High Court between 1974–1975, before he plunged into politics.

In 1985, P. Shiv Shankar was elected to Rajya Sabha from Gujarat and remained in Rajya Sabha till 1993 for two terms. He was Minister of External Affairs and Minister of Human Resource Development during these terms. He was deputy chairman of Planning Commission from 1987 to 1988. Then, P. Shiv Shankar became Leader of the House in Rajya Sabha from 1988 to 1989. After that, he served as Leader of the Opposition in Rajya Sabha during 1989 and 1991.

P. Shiv Shankar was sworn in as Governor of Sikkim on 21 September 1994. He remained in the post till 11 November 1995. He also was Governor of Kerala from 1995 to 1996.

In 1998 General elections, P. Shiv Shankar contested election from Tenali constituency, he defeated incumbent M.P. Sarada Tadiparthi of Telugu Desam Party and was elected to Lok Sabha.

In 2004, P. Shiv Shankar left the Congress party because he had alleged that party tickets in Andhra Pradesh were being sold. There was no response to either his resignation or the allegations made by him. In 2008, he joined Praja Rajyam Party formed by Telugu film actor Chiranjeevi. In August 2011, Praja Rajyam Party merged with Congress. He died on 27 February 2017, aged 87.

References

|-

|-

|-

|-

|-

1929 births
2017 deaths
Governors of Kerala
Politicians from Secunderabad
Governors of Sikkim
Lok Sabha members from Andhra Pradesh
Shiv Shankar P
India MPs 1980–1984
India MPs 1998–1999
Leaders of the Opposition in the Rajya Sabha
Indian National Congress politicians from Andhra Pradesh
Praja Rajyam Party politicians
Law Ministers of India
Ministers for External Affairs of India
Education Ministers of India
Ministers of Power of India
Commerce and Industry Ministers of India
Petroleum and Natural Gas Ministers of India
Members of the Cabinet of India